The seal of the Marshall Islands consists of a blue background, which represents the sea.  On the blue background, there is an angel with outstretched wings symbolizing peace.  Behind the angel, there are two islands with an outrigger canoe and a palm tree.  On the upper left and right in the shield are a red and white stripe.  Behind the shield there is a stylized nautical chart.  In the ring above the shield is the phrase Republic of the Marshall Islands, and below, the national motto, Jepilpilin ke Ejukaan (Marshallese: "Accomplishment Through Joint Effort").

National symbols of the Marshall Islands
Marshall Islands
Marshall Islands
Marshall islands
Marshall islands
Marshall islands
Marshall islands
Marshall islands
Marshall islands
Marshall islands